Young Triffie, directed by Mary Walsh, is a dark comedy written by Ray Guy, a Newfoundland essayist, based on his own play entitled Young Triffie's Been Made Away With (1985).

It was produced by Denise Robert and Daniel Louis and features a cast including Andrea Martin, Jonny Harris, Colin Mochrie, Susan Kent and Remy Girard, with lead actor Fred Ewanuick.

Set in 1947, before Newfoundland joined Confederation, the film is about a clumsy and unpopular Newfoundland Ranger (Alan Hepditch, played by Fred Ewanuick) who is sent to investigate a case of sexually assaulted and mutilated sheep in fictional outport Swyer's Harbour.

External links

2006 films
2006 black comedy films
Films set in Newfoundland and Labrador
English-language Canadian films
Canadian black comedy films
2006 comedy films
2000s English-language films
2000s Canadian films